Jánoshalma is a district in southern part of Bács-Kiskun County. Jánoshalma is also the name of the town where the district seat is found. The district is located in the Southern Great Plain Statistical Region.

Geography 
Jánoshalma District borders with Kiskőrös District to the north, Kiskunhalas District to the north and east, Bácsalmás District to the south, Baja District to the west, Kalocsa District to the northwest. The number of the inhabited places in Jánoshalma District is 5.

Municipalities 
The district has 2 towns and 3 villages.
(ordered by population, as of 1 January 2013)

The bolded municipalities are cities.

Demographics

In 2011, it had a population of 17,341 and the population density was 39/km².

Ethnicity
Besides the Hungarian majority, the main minorities are the Roma (approx. 800) and German (150).

Total population (2011 census): 17,341
Ethnic groups (2011 census): Identified themselves: 16,200 persons:
Hungarians: 15,160 (93.58%)
Gypsies: 767 (4.73%)
Others and indefinable: 273 (1.69%)
Approx. 1,000 persons in Jánoshalma District did not declare their ethnic group at the 2011 census.

Religion
Religious adherence in the county according to 2011 census:

Catholic – 11,378 (Roman Catholic – 11,360; Greek Catholic – 15);
Reformed – 273;
Evangelical – 42;
other religions – 247; 
Non-religious – 1,414; 
Atheism – 80;
Undeclared – 3,907.

Gallery

See also
List of cities and towns of Hungary

References

External links
 Postal codes of the Jánoshalma District

Districts in Bács-Kiskun County